Clare (Ewing) Grundman (May 11, 1913 in Cleveland, Ohio – June 15, 1996 in South Salem, New York) was an American composer and arranger.

Biography
He was born in Cleveland and graduated from Shaw High School in East Cleveland in 1930. He then attended Ohio State University, where he received a bachelor's degree in Music Education in 1934.  For a few years he taught instrumental music in Ohio and Kentucky public schools, but returned to Ohio State in 1937, where he taught orchestration, applied lessons in woodwind instruments, and conducted the band.  He received his MA degree in 1940.

After finishing his degree he moved to New York.  He then studied composition with Paul Hindemith at the Berkshire Music Center, and served as a military musician in the United States Coast Guard from 1942 to 1945.

Among his many awards were an Honorary Membership in the Women Band Directors International (1974), the AWAPA award of the National Band Association (1982), the American Bandmasters Association's Edwin Franko Goldman Memorial Citation (1983), the Sudler Order of Merit of the John Philip Sousa Foundation (1990), and the American School Band Directors Association's Goldman Award (1992).

In addition to his musical accomplishments he co-authored The New York Times 1974 Crossword Puzzle Dictionary.

Grundman was gay and in a long-term relationship.  After his death in 1996, Grundman's partner survived him for another sixteen years.  His papers and manuscripts are located in the Music and Dance Library at Ohio State.

Music
Grundman composed scores for films, radio, and television, as well as orchestrations for Broadway musicals. He also wrote a few works for various chamber ensembles and for full orchestra. However, he is best known for his many compositions and arrangements for symphonic band.

Many of his band pieces are rhapsodies or fantasies on folk tunes from various countries.  They are often played by American high school bands, especially An Irish Rhapsody, but he also used melodies from England, Finland, Japan, Norway, and Scotland.

His primary publisher is Boosey & Hawkes.

Writings
The New York Times Crossword Puzzle Dictionary", Third Edition, with Tom Pulliam (1974)

Musical works
Chamber music
 Bagatelle (Bagatelles) (for four clarinets)
 Caprice for Clarinets (for four clarinets or clarinet choir)
 Concertante (for alto saxophone and piano; originally for alto saxophone and band)
 Conversation for Cornet (for cornet and piano)
 Flutation (for flute trio or flute choir)
 Puppets (for two clarinets)
 Pat-a-Pan (Christmas carol for two flutes and snare drum)
 Scherzo (for six clarinets)
 Three Medieval Sketches (Joust, Chapel, and Pagent) (for two horns in F)
 Tuba Rhapsody (for tuba and piano, arrangement of work for tuba and band)
 Waltz and Interlude (for clarinet, flute and piano)
 Works for unaccompanied bassoon, English horn, and flute
 Zoo Illogical Voice (for winds, percussion, and piano)

Works for concert or symphonic band
 American Folk Rhapsody No. 1 
 American Folk Rhapsody No. 2
 American Folk Rhapsody No. 3
 American Folk Rhapsody No. 4
 An American Scene
 Black Knight
 The Blue And The Gray (Civil War Suite), 1961
 Burlesque
 Chessboard Suite
 Classical Overture
 Concertante for Alto Sax and Band, 1973
 Colonial Legend
 Concord, 1987
 A Copland Tribute
 Cowboy in Cuba
 Dance and Interlude
 English Christmas
 English Suite
 Fantasy on American Sailing Songs
 Fantasy on English Hunting Songs
 Festive Piece
 Finnish Rhapsody
 Green Domino
 Hebrides Suite (based on Airs from "Songs of the Hebrides", collected by Marjory Kennedy-Fraser
The Peat-Fire Flame
An Eriskay Love Lilt
Milking Song (Hebridean Game Song)
The Road to the Isles
 Holiday
 An Irish Rhapsody
 Kentucky 1800
 Little English Suite
The Leather Bottle
Roving
We Met
The Vicar of Bray
 Little March
 Little Suite for Band
 Music for a Carnival
 Nocturne (solo harp and wind ensemble)
 Normandy
 Northwest Saga
 Norwegian Rhapsody
 Overture on a Short Theme
 Quiet Christmas
 A Scottish Rhapsody
 Songs for Christmas
 Spirit of '76
 Three Carols for Christmas
 Three Sketches for Winds
 Trumpets Triumphant
 Tuba Rhapsody (solo tuba and band)
 Two Irish Songs
 Two Moods Overture, 1947
 A Welsh Rhapsody
 A Westchester Overture
 Western Dance

Arrangements for band
 Candide Suite (by Leonard Bernstein)
 A Copland Portrait (works by Aaron Copland)
 Divertimento (by Leonard Bernstein)
 A Somerset Rhapsody, Op. 21b (by Gustav Holst)
 Overture to Candide (by Leonard Bernstein)
Slava! (by Leonard Bernstein)

Orchestrations for musicalsDrat! The Cat!, 1965Show Girl, additional orchestrations for the 1961 revivalJoyce Grenfell Requests the Pleasure, 1955Phoenix ’55, 1955Two’s Company, 1952-53Lend an Ear, 1948-50

References

Sources

Further reading
 Mark Aldrich, A Catalog of Folk Song Settings for Wind Band (Meredith Music, 2004)
 William H. Rehrig, The Heritage Encyclopedia of Band Music (Westerville, OH, 1991, suppl. 1996); CD-ROM (Oskaloosa, IA, 2005), includes a selective works list
 Norman E. Smith, Program Notes for Band'' (Lake Charles, LA, 2000), pp. 255–6

External links
Clare Grundman  as part of the "History of the Ohio State University Concert Bands"
Clare E. Grundman, on the "Military Music" web site
Clare Grundman, in "The Wind Repertory Project" web site

1913 births
1996 deaths
20th-century American composers
20th-century American male musicians
20th-century classical composers
20th-century American LGBT people
American classical composers
American male classical composers
Classical musicians from Ohio
LGBT classical composers
Musicians from Cleveland
People from South Salem, New York
Tanglewood Music Center alumni